Within the branch of materials science known as material failure theory, the Goodman relation (also called a Goodman diagram, a Goodman-Haigh diagram, a Haigh diagram or a Haigh-Soderberg diagram) is an equation used to quantify the interaction of mean and alternating stresses on the fatigue life of a material. The equation is typically presented as a linear curve of mean stress vs. alternating stress that provides the maximum number of alternating stress cycles a material will withstand before failing from fatigue.

A scatterplot of experimental data shown on an amplitude versus mean stress plot can often be approximated by a parabola known as the Gerber line, which can in turn be (conservatively) approximated by a straight line called the Goodman line.

Mathematical description

The relations can be represented mathematically as:

, Gerber Line (parabola)
, Goodman Line 
, Soderberg Line

The Gerber parabola is indication of the region just beneath the failure points during experiment.

The Goodman line is much safer consideration than the Gerber parabola because it is completely inside the Gerber parabola and excludes some of area which is nearby to failure region.

The general trend given by the Goodman relation is one of decreasing fatigue life with increasing mean stress for a given level of alternating stress.  The relation can be plotted to determine the safe cyclic loading of a part; if the coordinate given by the mean stress and the alternating stress lies under the curve given by the relation, then the part will survive. If the coordinate is above the curve, then the part will fail for the given stress parameters.

References

Bibliography
Goodman, J., Mechanics Applied to Engineering, Longman, Green & Company, London, 1899.
Hertzberg, Richard W., Deformation and Fracture Mechanics and Engineering Materials. John Wiley and Sons, Hoboken, NJ: 1996.
Mars, W.V., Computed dependence of rubber's fatigue behavior on strain crystallization. Rubber Chemistry and Technology, 82(1), 51-61. 2009.

Further reading

External links
Fatpack. Fatigue analysis in python with Goodman mean stress correction implementation.

Materials science
Fracture mechanics
Rubber properties